Francis David "Frank" Castle Sr. is a fictional character portrayed by Jon Bernthal in television series set in the Marvel Cinematic Universe (MCU)—based on the Marvel Comics character of the same name—commonly known by his alias, The Punisher. Introduced in the 2016 second season of Daredevil, Bernthal signed a deal to return for a spin-off series, The Punisher (2017–2019); his portrayal of the character has been positively received. Bernthal will again reprise his role as the Punisher in Daredevil: Born Again (2024).

Concept and creation 

In October 2013, Marvel and Disney announced that Marvel Television and ABC Studios would provide Netflix with live-action series centered around the Marvel Comics characters Daredevil, Jessica Jones, Iron Fist, and Luke Cage, leading up to a miniseries based on the Defenders. In June 2015, Marvel announced that Jon Bernthal had been cast as Frank Castle / Punisher for the second season of Daredevil. Steven DeKnight and the first-season's writers had discussed introducing the character in a post-credits scene during the first-season finale, but were unable to due to the way that Netflix then-began auto-playing the next episode during the credits of the current one. The scene would have seen Leland Owlsley escape rather than be killed by Wilson Fisk, only to be killed by Castle, whose face would not be revealed, but whose iconic skull insignia would have been featured. DeKnight felt that this "was the right decision. I think there's a better, more organic way to introduce him to the world." A spin-off series centered on Castle had entered development by January 2016. The series, The Punisher, was officially ordered that April, and the first season was released on Netflix in November 2017.

DeKnight said this version of Punisher would be "completely the Marvel version", as previous portrayals did not appear under the Marvel Studios / Marvel Television banner. He also felt Bernthal's Punisher would not be as "graphically violent" as in Punisher: War Zone.

Fictional character biography

Television series 

In the second season of Daredevil, Matt Murdock / Daredevil first encounters Frank Castle when he targets some gangs in Hell's Kitchen, the killings for which he is dubbed "The Punisher" in the news media. After Frank is arrested, Karen Page investigates his past to find his motivation for the killings: his family having been gunned down in a carousel earlier in the year by members of the gang. After Daredevil helps Frank fake his death, he returns in the season finale to assist Daredevil by sniping the Hand ninjas attempting to kill him.

In the first season of The Punisher, Frank has retired from being the Punisher, working as a construction worker under the name "Pete Castiglione". After uncovering a larger conspiracy beyond what was done to him and his family linked to Frank's wartime experience with the CIA-affiliated "Cerberus Squad", Frank allies with ex-NSA analyst David "Micro" Lieberman to seek the truth.

In the second season of The Punisher, Frank Castle is drawn into the mystery surrounding the attempted murder of Amy Bendix where she is targeted by John Pilgrim under the orders of Anderson and Eliza Schwartz. At the same time, Frank's former best friend Billy Russo is slowly turned into the psychotic Jigsaw.

Appearances
Jon Bernthal portrays Frank Castle / Punisher in two Marvel Cinematic Universe Netflix television series, debuting as the character in the second season of Daredevil in 2016 in a supporting role, before starring as the character in the spin-off series The Punisher (2017–2019). He will return in the Disney+ series Daredevil: Born Again (2024).

Characterization
The Punisher season two showrunner Doug Petrie stated that Travis Bickle from Taxi Driver was an influence on the character, as well as current events, saying, "Taking lethal justice into your own hands in America in 2015 is tricky shit. We have not shied away from the rich complicated reality of Now. If you've got a gun and you're not the police you're going to incite strong feelings." Bernthal added that "This character has resonated with law enforcement and military ... and the best thing about him is that if he offends you, he just doesn't care." Bernthal studied all the previous portrayals of Punisher, saying, "once you devour and eat up as much as you can, my way is to make it as personal as possible". On how Castle resonates with him, Bernthal said, "He ain't got a fucking cape. He ain't got any superpowers. He's a fucking tortured, angry father and husband who's living in this unbelievable world of darkness and loss and torment." Bernthal added that there would be "a military component" in the series since Castle is "a soldier... [The series] will be somewhat centered on that". He also stated that "the character that was portrayed on Daredevil season two was sort of the origin tale of how this guy became the Punisher, why he put on the vest." Bernthal noted he "always want[ed] to preserve the essence of" Castle, who Bernthal described as "brutal", "damaged" and "tortured", by exploring "the pain and what's behind the violence and the reason why he's committing the violence" that is "utterly satisfying and addictive for him".

Drew Goddard felt that television was the best fit for the character, as the writers are "able to do things on the small screen that fit that character better than if we had to water him down for the movies." Petrie and Marco Ramirez talked about creating their version of the character following the film versions, with Ramirez saying, "even if you know the character, you've never seen him like this. That was the big thing we wanted. There are four movies, eight hours and four actors. We've seen this guy. We think we know who he is, but even we learned that he's so much more." Petrie said, "We hope to make people forget what they've seen before, whether they've loved it or not." In order to get in the correct mindset to portray Castle, Bernthal trained with military members, along with receiving weapon training. Bernthal also "had to put myself in as dark of place as possible" to connect with "the emptiness inside" Castle, and isolate himself, including walking across the Brooklyn Bridge to get to set "to shed any outside influence of joy." Rosario Dawson, who felt Matt Murdock behaved like the Punisher in Daredevil season one, felt it would "be really interesting to see how [the writers] differentiate" the two in the second season. Describing the character, Bernthal said, "As a man who put his [life] on the line and really went through the ultimate sacrifice for this country in his involvement in the military. He's a guy who brought the war home with him [in] the worst possible way. There are a lot of iterations of this character and in all of them it's a man who's gone through this unbelievable trauma and what's interesting about our take on him is how this trauma reshapes his own philosophy." Bernthal also talked about the character's 'superpowers', saying, "If I got one thing from the comics, I think, as far as superpowers... his superpower is his rage. His superpower is that he is not going to quit, and he is going to go forward no matter what. And that's as human and grounded a quality as I think as this sort of genre could have".

In other media
Stuntman Eric Linden, who worked on The Punisher as a stunt coordinator, second unit director and stunt double of Jon Bernthal, directed and played the lead role of the Punisher in the 2020 short fan film Skull: Punisher Reawakened, produced in association with FXitinPost.

Reception

Accolades

See also
 List of Daredevil (TV series) characters
 Characters of the Marvel Cinematic Universe

References

External links
 Frank Castle on the Marvel Cinematic Universe Wiki
 

American male characters in television
Daredevil (TV series)
Fictional characters from Manhattan
Fictional characters with post-traumatic stress disorder
Fictional gunfighters in television
Fictional gunfighters
Fictional marksmen and snipers
Fictional mass murderers
Fictional military captains
Fictional prison escapees
Fictional prisoners and detainees in the United States
Fictional sole survivors
Fictional torturers and interrogators
Fictional United States Marine Corps Force Reconnaissance personnel
Fictional vigilantes
Fictional War in Afghanistan (2001–2021) veterans
Marvel Cinematic Universe characters
Marvel Comics military personnel
Marvel Comics television characters
The Punisher (TV series)
Punisher characters
Superhero television characters
Television characters introduced in 2016